The winners of the Star Screen Awards for Best Dialogue are listed below:

See also
 Screen Awards
 Bollywood
 Cinema of India

Screen Awards